Sándor Bejczy (1920–2004) was a Hungarian politician, member of the National Assembly (MP) from FKGP National List between 1990 and 1994.

Biography
He was born in Körmend. He served as chief treasurer of the FKGP from 1945 to 1951. He participated in the reorganization of the FKGP during the Hungarian Revolution of 1956. As a result, he was interned in the next year.

Bejczy secured a mandate in the first democratic parliamentary election in 1990. He was a member of the Committee on Defence since June 12, 1990 and of the Committee on Audit Office since October 13, 1992. In February 1992 he joined the United Smallholders' Party (EKGP) which continued to support the Cabinet of József Antall in contrast to the FKGP parliamentary group led by József Torgyán. Bejczy died in 2004.

References

1920 births
2004 deaths
Independent Smallholders, Agrarian Workers and Civic Party politicians
Members of the National Assembly of Hungary (1990–1994)
People from Körmend